Secrets of the London Underground is a British factual documentary series presented by railway historian Tim Dunn and London Transport Museum's Engagement Manager Siddy Holloway, who co-develops 'Hidden London,' the museum's programme of tours that gives visitors access to disused and historical parts of the network. Born as Sigurbjörg Alma Ingólfsdóttir, Holloway is also a screen and stage actress known for the 2001 film Regina.

Secrets of the London Underground was first broadcast in the United Kingdom from 19 July 2021 on Yesterday. The series explores hidden areas of the London Underground such as abandoned tunnels, secret bunkers and hidden staircases, and delves into the archives of the London Transport Museum's Acton Depot.
The format of the programme generally centres around visiting two abandoned areas of the London Underground, in addition to viewing some of the Museum's collection at Acton, usually with Assistant Director and 'Hidden London' co-developer Chris Nix.

The first programme opened with 388,300 viewers and a 2.7% share, the highest rated programme on Yesterday and the 5th most non-PSB programme watched that week.

The series is a UKTV original, commissioned for Yesterday and produced by Brown Bob Productions, following on from the success of Dunn's previous UKTV series The Architecture the Railways Built. Jacqueline Hewer, CEO of the programme's production company, stated "We can promise one thing - you'll never travel on the tube again without wondering what's through that door at the end of the platform..." UKTV's Hilary Rosen, deputy director of commissioning, described the series as "Viewers are fascinated by the Tube and this series promises unseen locations, fresh stories and secrets galore from right across the city."

After 659,000 viewers watched the first series, making it the Yesterday channel's highest rated programme ever, the show was recommissioned for a second series of ten episodes, which began broadcasting in May 2022.

A third series was announced on 2 February 2023 for broadcast later in the year.

Episodes

Series 1

Series 2

References

External links 

 
 
 

2021 British television series debuts
2020s British documentary television series
Documentary television series about railway transport
UKTV original programming
English-language television shows